Pamukkale University (PAU) is a public university in Denizli, Turkey. The university has 45,000 students and 1400 academicians.

History

Early years

Pamukkale University's history began as a Female Normal School in 1957 in Denizli. It then turned into Education Institute in 1976 and served under Dokuz Eylül University as Denizli Education College in 1982. Denizli State Academy of Engineering and Architecture also opened in 1955 and later converted to College of Engineering.

Faculties

Faculty of Education 
 Teaching Social Fields
 Teaching English Language
 Teaching Preschool
 Teaching Music
 Psychological Counselling and Guidance
 Teaching Primary School
 Teaching Fine Arts
 Teaching Educative Sciences
 Teaching Turkish Language

Faculty of Arts and Sciences
 Archaeology
 Biology
 Chemistry
 Contemporary Turkish Dialects and Literatures
 History
 History of Art
 Mathematics
 Philosophy
 Physics
 Sociology
 Turkish Language and Literature
 Western Language and Literature

Faculty of Economics and Administrative Sciences
 Business Studies
 Political Science and Public Administration
 Labour Economics and Industrial Relations
 Economics
 Finance

Faculty of Engineering 
 Computer Engineering
 Environmental Engineering
 Electrical and Electronic Engineering
 Industrial Engineering
 Food Engineering
 Civil Engineering
 Geophysics Engineering
 Geological Engineering
 Chemistry Engineering
 Mechanical engineering
 Textile Engineering

Faculty of Technical Education
 Teaching Automobile Mechanics
 Teaching Computer Systems
 Teaching Electronics

Faculty of Medicine
 Medicine

Faculty of Architecture and Design
 Architecture
 Landscape Architecture
 Urban & Regional Planning

Faculty of Theology
 Theology

Schools

Denizli School of Health

School of Physical Therapy and Rehabilitation

School of Sports Sciences and Technologies
 Recreation
 Trainer Education
 Teaching Physical Education and Sports

School of Foreign Languages

Vocational schools

Denizli Vocational School
 Computer Technology and Programming/Child Development
 Handcrafts/Electrics/Industrial Electronics
 Chemistry/Mechanics/Furniture and Decoration
 Automobile/Textile
 Tourism and Hotel Management

Denizli Vocational School of Health Services
 Ambulance and Emergency Care Technician
 Anaesthesia
 Dialysis
 Physical Therapy
 Hydrotherapy
 Medical Documentation and Secretariat
 Medical lab

Bekilli Vocational School
 Office Management and Secretariat/Foreign trade
 Accounting/Marketing

Buldan Vocational School
 Office Management and Secretariat
 Foreign Trade
 Fashion and Textile Design
 Accounting
 Marketing

Çivril Vocational School
 Accounting
 Business Studies/Foreign Trade

Honaz Vocational School
 Banking
 Office Management and Secretariat
 Foreign Trade
 Public Relations/Business Studies
 Capital Market and Stock Exchange
 Accounting/Marketing

Institutes

Institute of Applied Sciences
Master's programmes
 Computer Engineering
 Environmental Engineering
 Electrical-Electronic Engineering
 Industrial Engineering
 Food Engineering
 Civil Engineering
 Geological Engineering
 Chemical Engineering
 Mechanical Engineering
 Textile Engineering
 Science Education
 Secondary school Education in the fields of science and mathematics without thesis
 Automobile mechanics education
 Biology
 Physics
 Chemistry
 Mathematics

Ph.D. programmes
 Food Engineering
 Civil Engineering
 Geological Engineering
 Mechanical Engineering
 Biology
 Chemistry

Institute of Health Sciences
Master's programmes
 Anatomy
 Training and Movement
 Physical Education and Sports
 Physical Education and Sports Training
 Biochemistry
 Biostatistics
 Biophysics
 Pharmacology
 Physiology
 Physical Therapy and Rehabilitation
 Work and Occupational Therapy
 Public health Nursing
 Public health
 Histology and Embryology
 Microbiology
 Psychosocial Fields in Sport
 Medical biology 
Ph.D. programmes
 Biochemistry
 Biophysics
 Physiology
 Physiotherapy and rehabilitation
 Neurological sciences

Institute of Social Sciences
Master's programmes
 Archaeology
 Western Languages and Literatures
 Educative Sciences Education
 Philosophy
 Fine Arts Education
 Economics
 Primary School Education
 Business studies
 Political science and public administration
 Finance
 History of Art
 Sociology
 History
 Turkish Language Education
 Turkish Language and Literature
 Secondary
 School science education
 English language education
Ph.D. programmes
 Economics
 Educative Sciences
 Turkish language and Literature
 Archaeology
 History
 Sociology

Institute of Islamic Sciences 
 Master's programmes
 Basic Islamıc Studies 
 Philosophy and Religious Studies
 Ph.D. programmes
 Philosophy and Religious Studies

See also
Pamukkale
List of universities in Turkey

References

External links

Pamukkale University home page 
Pamukkale University main page 
PAU Faculty of Engineering 
Contemporary Turkish Dialects page 

Educational institutions established in 1992
State universities and colleges in Turkey
Universities and colleges in Turkey
Denizli
1992 establishments in Turkey
Buildings and structures in Denizli Province

mk:Универзитет Богазичи